The Broughton River is a river in the Australian state of South Australia.

Course
The river flows from the junction of the Hill River and the Yakillo Creek immediately south of Spalding in a westerly direction towards Spencer Gulf.

Tributaries of the Broughton include Freshwater Creek, Bundaleer Creek, the Rocky River, Crystal Brook, Yakillo Creek, the Hill River and the Hutt River. The river descends  over its  course.

History

The river was named in May 1839 in honour of the Anglican cleric, William Broughton, by the explorer, Edward John Eyre.

See also

Rivers of South Australia

References

External links
Broughton River Catchment official webpage

Rivers of South Australia
Mid North (South Australia)